The Last Hero is a fantasy novel by Terry Pratchett.

The Last Hero may also refer to:
 The Last Hero (The Saint), a 1930 adventure novel by Leslie Charteris
 The Last Hero (album), a 2016 album by Alter Bridge
 Last Hero, a Russian reality TV series
 Posledniy geroy (The Last Hero in English), a 1989 album by Soviet band Kino

See also
 Last Hero in China, a martial arts film 
 The Lost Hero, a fantasy-adventure novel by Rick Riordan